Shigeki Morimoto (Japanese: 森本 茂樹, Hepburn: Morimoto Shigeki, born October 1, 1967) is a game designer and programmer currently working at Game Freak. He has been involved in nearly every main series Pokémon game, since Pokémon Red and Blue Versions where he was a programmer, and the creator of the battle system and the Pokémon "Mew". Since then, he has served as the director of more recent games in the series.

Games

References

External links
Shigeki Morimoto on Bulbapedia

1967 births
Living people
Japanese video game designers
Nintendo people
Pokémon
Place of birth missing (living people)